The 1955 Madaba riot, sometimes also referred as the Madaba massacre took place in the predominantly Christians Jordanian town of Madaba, when a number of Christians were killed by Islamist rioters.

The riot seems to have begun in a dispute between Christian and Muslim taxi drivers, after which the Salt monastery was attacked by members of the Hizb ut-Tahrir, eventually transforming in into an all-out sectarian riot. It is claimed that the event was instigated by the Muslim Brotherhood and Hizb ut-Tahrir. It was also claimed that a Jordanian Parliament Member, Muhammad Salim Abu al-Ghanam, was behind the eruption of the riot.

Wide-scale anti-Hashemite riots took place the same year in December, lasting for five days. Those came as a result of an attempt to bring Jordan into the Baghdad Pact. The riots were severe – foreign consulates were attacked and many people were killed and wounded throughout the country. The riots were quelled only with the military intervention of the Arab Legion and imposition of a curfew. As a result of the riots, the Majali government fell and the introduction of Jordan into the pact was cancelled.

See also

Jeddah Massacre of 1858
Istanbul pogrom

References

Persecution of Christians by Muslims
1955 in Jordan
Massacres of Christians
Madaba Governorate
1955 riots
Riots and civil disorder in Jordan
Hizb ut-Tahrir
Massacres in Jordan